Dedication is the act of consecrating an altar, temple, church, or other sacred building.

Dedication of churches

See also
Consecration
Cornerstone
Ex-voto
Dedication (publishing)
Solomon's Temple#Dedication

References

Citations

Sources

External links 

Urbs Beata Jerusalem dicta pacis visio - Catholic Encyclopedia article
 Music Dedications Database - Database of dedications by Classical composers

 
Rituals attending construction